東北 means northeast in Chinese characters.

It may refer to:

Northeast China, a geographical area of China
Tōhoku region, a geographical area of Japan